Quincy Wilson can refer to:

Quincy Wilson (running back) (born 1981), a former NFL running back
Quincy Wilson (cornerback) (born 1996), an NFL cornerback for the New York Giants